Wadham School is a school for pupils aged 11–18 situated on a  site on the outskirts of Crewkerne in Somerset, England. The school has been rated Good by Ofsted since May 2014.

School site
Wadham School opened in purpose built accommodation in 1971, as a Church of England, Voluntary Controlled, Upper Comprehensive, replacing the local grammar school

Links with middle schools 

Wadham School receives pupils from two Middle Schools (ages 9–13), Maiden Beech in Crewkerne and Swanmead in Ilminster. Close links are maintained with these schools, with members of the senior management teams of the three schools meeting regularly and departments maintaining constant liaison through INSET, by visits to each other’s schools and by formal meetings. From time to time the three schools hold joint INSET (in-service education and training programme) days. (There is also very close collaboration with other schools in the area particularly in the field of professional development courses for staff.)

There are nine First Schools (5-9) from where pupils eventually come on to Wadham School, six servicing Maiden Beech and three Swanmead.

Ofsted: Special Measures 
In November 2005, Wadham was placed into Special measures after failing an Ofsted inspection. In June 2007 Wadham successfully left Special Measures, after a full Ofsted inspection showed the school had sufficiently progressed.

Notable former pupils 
 Gary Mortimer, hot air balloon pilot
 David Darling, video game designer

References

External links
 School website
 DCSF Page About Us

Crewkerne
Upper schools in Somerset
Voluntary controlled schools in England
Church of England secondary schools in the Diocese of Bath and Wells